Kevin Alastair Kyle (born 7 June 1981) is a Scottish retired footballer and media personality who played as a centre forward. He played for eleven senior clubs in his career. Kyle gained ten full Scotland international caps and scored one goal.

After starting as a youngster at Ayr United, Kyle began his professional career with Sunderland, where he had been in the youth team. He remained at the Stadium of Light for six years, making 91 appearances in the Football League, scoring 17 goals. He also made his debut for both the Scotland under−21s and its senior team during his time in the North East, as well as gaining promotion to the Premier League in 2004–05. In 2006, he moved to Coventry City, for whom he made 44 league appearances and scored five goals. In 2009, Kyle signed for Kilmarnock, marking his professional debut in his homeland. After a year in East Ayrshire, during which he scored 16 goals, he signed for Hearts in 2010. In two years at Tynecastle, Kyle scored seven goals in his 19 league appearances. In 2012, Kyle joined Rangers, where he made eight league appearances and scored three goals, and won the Third Division title as the club began its climb back to top tier. He finished his career back at Ayr United in 2013, aged 32, and retired the following year.

Early life
Kyle was born and grew up in Stranraer, Scotland where as well as playing for his school team and local amateur sides he was selected to play for Dumfries and Galloway region. Also in the same Dumfries and Galloway team was fellow Stranraer boy Allan Jenkins.

Playing career

Sunderland
Kyle began his career as a youth at Ayr United before joining Sunderland in 1998, where he was a prolific scorer for their reserves. However, he was unable to force his way into a first team that boasted the striking talent of Kevin Phillips and Niall Quinn. Instead, he gained first team experience on loan with Huddersfield, Darlington and Rochdale. It was on loan at Darlington that Kyle scored his first career goals, notching against Sudbury in the FA Cup and Mansfield Town in the league.

After finally breaking into the Sunderland first team in the 2003–04 season he ended up as their joint top goalscorer with 16 goals to help them to the play-offs. However, he missed most of the following season owing to a hip injury and his recovery was aided by visits to Bayern Munich doctor Hans-Wilhelm Müller-Wohlfahrt and American hip surgeon Marc Phillipon. He returned to first team action in February 2006, scoring his first and only Premier League goal in March 2006, away to Manchester City, in a season that saw Sunderland relegated on a then-record low points tally.

Coventry City
Kyle then joined Coventry City on 25 August 2006 for £600,000, but only went on to score three goals during the campaign. He scored just two more. Out of favour with the Sky Blues and despised by their fans, he traded a relegation battle with Coventry for a promotion push with a loan to fellow Championship side Wolverhampton Wanderers during the latter half of the 2007–08 season, reuniting him with his former Sunderland boss Mick McCarthy. He made 13 appearances, nine as substitute, scoring once against Crystal Palace. While Wolves finished seventh, outside the play-offs, his move was not made permanent as Kyle said he would rather return to Coventry, who finished a point clear of the relegation positions in 21st, in the summer. After failing to feature at all during the opening stages of the next season for his parent club, he joined Hartlepool United on a month's loan on 1 October 2008. The loan was later extended until the end of the year, and Kyle scored five goals in 15 starts.

Kilmarnock
On 27 January 2009, Coventry announced that they had reached an agreement with Kyle over the remaining six months of his contract, and he had left the club by mutual consent. Two days later, he signed for Kilmarnock on an 18-month contract. On 31 January 2009 he scored a headed goal on his debut for Kilmarnock against St Mirren and this goal was also the first at the new St Mirren Park. On 11 April he scored all three goals, his first ever professional hat-trick, in a 3–0 victory against Falkirk for which he received a standing ovation when he was substituted. Kyle was praised for his part in keeping Killie in the SPL that season. In the games following the 2008–2009 season Scottish Premier League split, Kyle scored all of Kilmarnock's goals in a draw with Falkirk and victories against St Mirren and Inverness Caledonian Thistle thus helping the team secure 8th place and SPL survival. He scored eight goals in total that season.

Kyle was made Kilmarnock club captain for the 2009–10 season. He started where he left off by scoring twice in the opening day 3–0 home victory over Hamilton and his good form won him a recall to the Scotland squad after an absence of five years. In the Scottish League Cup game against Morton (in which he also scored) he suffered a knee injury, sidelining him for three weeks and causing him to miss the final two World Cup qualifiers against Macedonia and the Netherlands on 5 and 10 September 2009. In January 2010, he relinquished the club captaincy following his involvement in the events that ultimately led to the departure of manager Jim Jefferies.

Kyle became unhappy at Kilmarnock and went on trial with Russian side PFC Spartak Nalchik with a view to join them at the end of the season when his current deal expired but rejected a move. Whilst playing in a trial match there he picked up an injury, angering manager Calderwood as he missed key games for the club.

Hearts
Kyle signed a two-year contract with Hearts on 3 June 2010, which reunited him with Jim Jefferies, making his debut on 14 August 2010 against St Johnstone as a 66th-minute substitute. His first goal for the club came the following week against Hamilton in Hearts 4–0 win. He took over taking penalty kicks at the club and scored six goals out of six from the spot, plus another four from open play, in the 2010–11 season. He scored a late winner in the Edinburgh derby against Hibernian on 1 January 2011. The remainder of his 2010–11 season was blighted by a hip injury, as Kyle made his last appearance of the season on 11 January. The injury continued to trouble Kyle in the 2011–12 season. After several setbacks Kyle admitted that he feared this could be the end of his footballing career. Kyle underwent a further operation on his hip in January 2012, but was released from his contract in March 2012.

Rangers
Kyle was initially invited back to train with Hearts during the 2012–13 pre-season however this fell through following the departure of manager Paulo Sérgio. He began training with Dunfermline and featured for them as a trialist during their pre-season friendlies. He then joined St Johnstone on trial. After revealing he would be open to a move to Rangers, Kyle accepted an invite to take part in one of their training sessions. On 7 August 2012, Kyle signed a one-year contract with Rangers. Kyle made his Rangers debut on the same day as signing as a substitute at home to East Fife in the League Cup first round. On 16 March 2013, Kyle left the club by mutual consent.

Ayr United
Kyle started training with Ayr in late August 2013, and soon began playing in reserve games. He made his debut, although as a trialist, after being subbed on in a 1–1 draw at Stenhousemuir. Kyle played one more game before finally signing a contract, which was held up due to financial constraints, that lasted until January 2014.

International career
Kyle has represented Scotland at under-21, and at full international level making ten appearances scoring once, against a Hong Kong League XI during the HKSAR Reunification Cup in May 2002. His last call up was for a friendly against the Faroe Islands in November 2010.

Career statistics

Club

International

International goals
Scores and results list Scotland's goal tally first.

Honours
Sunderland
Football League Championship Champions: 2004–05
Rangers
Scottish Football League Third Division Champions: 2012–13
Individual
 North East Football Award – young player of the year: 2004

Darts

Kevin entered the BDO Scottish Open darts tournament in 2016, reaching the last 256. He beat Lakeside semi-finalist Richard Veenstra, who was ninth seed in the tournament, on the way.

Personal life
Kyle is married to Lynn, with whom he has four sons. His brother-in-law is fellow Stanraer native Jamie Adams.

After retiring, Kyle worked in the Shetland Islands for two years, doing 18-day stints of 12-hour shifts as a room-keeper on the MS Regina Baltica cruiseferry. "Life was pretty shit," he said. At a Clyde F.C. training camp, he met Simon Ferry, who asked him if he'd like to come on his Keeping the Ball on the Ground podcast.

Media career 
In 2018, Kyle was interviewed by Simon Ferry on the YouTube channel Open Goal. "I did the interview and I thought, 'This could be quite good.' I don't know how to filter things and just say things how it is." After returning to the channel for a few appearances, Kyle became a permanent fixture on the channel, regularly featuring on the channel's podcast with Ferry and Paul Slane, as well as Andy Halliday later on. The show has gained a large cult following, and Open Goal was awarded 'Best Podcast' at the 2019 Football Blogging Awards.

References

External links

1981 births
Living people
People from Stranraer
Association football forwards
Scottish footballers
Scotland under-21 international footballers
Scotland B international footballers
Scotland international footballers
Sunderland A.F.C. players
Huddersfield Town A.F.C. players
Darlington F.C. players
Rochdale A.F.C. players
Coventry City F.C. players
Wolverhampton Wanderers F.C. players
Hartlepool United F.C. players
Kilmarnock F.C. players
Heart of Midlothian F.C. players
Rangers F.C. players
Premier League players
English Football League players
Scottish Premier League players
People educated at Stranraer Academy
Scottish Football League players
Footballers from Dumfries and Galloway
Ayr United F.C. players
Newton Stewart F.C. players
Scottish Professional Football League players